Classic Tour was the first solo UK tour by English singer Joe McElderry. The tour took place throughout November 2011.

Support Acts
Roxanne Emery
The Reason 4
Lorraine Crosby

About the tour
For the tour, McElderry performed songs of his albums, Wide Awake, released under Syco, Classic, released under Decca, and would later add "Last Christmas" to the set, which is featured on his third album, Classic Christmas, also released under Decca. He also performed songs that was sung on The X Factor and The X Factor Tour 2010 as well as some new covers that he had never sung before. He set up a poll on his Facebook asking which song he should sing on the tour, the choices were "Home", "I Won't Let You Go", "Halo", "Someone Like You", "Your Song" or "The Edge of Glory". "Home" was chosen to be performed on the tour. The tour scored third place on Billboard's Hot Tours, with grosses of £421,219 (US$665,833).

Setlist

Show Opener
If You Love Me
Real Late Starter
Smile
Wide Awake
The X Factor
Don't Stop Believin'
Love Story
Open Arms
Superman
Ambitions
Affirmation
Until The Stars Run Out
Classic
To Where You Are
Canto Della Terra
Dance With My Father
Solitaire
Time To Say Goodbye
Nessun Dorma
Encore
Over The Rainbow
Home
Last Christmas (added on 14 November)
The Climb

Tour Dates
The first two shows were warm up gigs and were not advertised on his official website. A second Newcastle City Hall gig was added due to popular demand.

References

2011 concert tours